Kasim Ajani Hill (born December 9, 1997) is an American football quarterback for the Rhode Island Rams. He started his college football career with Maryland. In 2017 he suffered a season-ending injury and in 2018 he went 5–5 in the ten games he started. He would transfer to Tennessee but not play for them due to NCAA transfer rules. He would make his final stop when he transferred to Rhode Island in 2020.

In his first season with the Rams, despite the season being moved and shortened due to COVID-19 he helped lead the team to two back-to-back upset wins against ranked opponents. In the next season he led the team to a 7–4 record and had his best season as a starter to that point in his career. In 2021 he was a two-time CAA Offensive Player of the Week and a recipient of the NEFWA Gold Helmet Award. The following year the team repeated with the same record and won their fourth consecutive Governor's Cup and Hill's second consecutive. He beat all statistical career-highs in 2022 as the team was short of a playoff appearance, following the season he was granted his seventh year of eligibility.

Early life and high school
Hill was born on December 9, 1997, in Washington, D.C. He started his high school football career with Gilman School in Baltimore, Maryland before moving to and attending St. John's College High School in Washington D.C. Coming out of St. John's College he was a consensus four-star recruit according to all major recruiting databases, he was ranked the 93rd-ranked overall player in the class of 2017 according to Rivals.com. He was named the 2017 Gatorade Player of the Year for Washington, D.C. as well as playing for Team Armour in the 2017 Under Armour All-American Game. At The Opening's Washington, D.C. Regional he earned quarterback honors.

As a junior at Gilman School he was an All-MIAA selection at quarterback while also being an honorable mention for the All-State Team.

In Hill's senior year in 2016, he moved to St. John's College, where he was an American Family/USA Today All-USA Washington, D.C. First Team, Washington Post All-Metro Honorable Mention, and WCAC All-Conference Third Team selection. He threw for 1,431 yards and sixteen touchdowns while also rushing for 885 yards and ten touchdowns. He led the Cadets to an 8–4 record and an appearance in the WCAC championship game. He received offers from Michigan, Penn State, and Michigan State but ultimately chose to play for Maryland.

College career

Maryland
In Hill's true freshman season, he played in three games for the Terrapins, starting two. He made his college football debut on the road against No. 23 Texas in relief on injured Tyrrell Pigrome. When he entered the game Maryland had a lead and Hill closed out the victory by completing all three of his pass attempts and rushing for a touchdown. He made his first start against FCS opponent Towson the following week as Pigrome continued to deal with his injury. In the team's 63–17 win he went thirteen of sixteen for 163 yards and two touchdowns, the first of which being a nine yard pass to D.J. Moore. His 81.3% completion percentage was good enough for seventh-highest in a single game in Maryland history. He would start the following week against UCF, completing both of his attempts before suffering a season-ending injury.

In Hill's redshirt freshman season, he started the first ten games of the season for Maryland. He started the season against No. 23 Texas with a win where he threw for a then career-high 222 passing yards, seventeen completions, and a career-long completion of 65 yards to Jeshaun Jones. He started the season throwing 84 pass attempts before throwing his first interception against Temple, which would be the longest streak for a Terrapin's quarterback since Danny O'Brien in 2010. On the season he completed 84 of 170 pass attempts for 1,083 passing yards alongside nine touchdowns and four interceptions. In a game against Illinois he threw for a career-high 265 passing yards and three touchdowns. He tied his career-high of three touchdowns again in a game against Rutgers. After the season Hill announced he would enter the transfer portal.

Tennessee 
On August 22, 2019, Hill transferred to Tennessee. In Hill's redshirt sophomore season, due to NCAA transfer rules he would have to sit the entirety of the 2019 season. Despite not playing, he was a crucial part of the Volunteers' scout team. After the season Hill announced he would enter the transfer portal for a second time.

Rhode Island 
On November 28, 2020, Hill transferred to Rhode Island. Rhode Island and the CAA would postpone the 2020 fall season and move it to the spring of 2021, while also cancelling the final three games. In Hill's redshirt junior season, he played in all three games for the Rams. He made his debut against No. 6 Villanova after the team's original season-opener against Bryant was postponed. Against the Wildcats he went eighteen of 28 for 246 yards and ran for 36 yards and the game-winning touchdown in overtime. The next week against No. 18/19 Albany he went thirteen of 25 for 118 yards and one touchdown. In overtime of that game he once again ran for the game-winning touchdown. In the team's final game of the year against No. 9 Delaware he went five of ten for 26 yards and one touchdown but could not come up with their third straight upset win. He would be benched late in the third quarter for fellow redshirt sophomore Brandon Robinson.

In Hill's redshirt junior season, this time the fall 2021 season, he started every game for the Rams. In the first game of the season he completed twelve of eighteen for 249 yards and two touchdowns while rushing for 33 yards and another touchdown in a 45–21 win against Bryant. The team would win again next week against Albany as Hill went fifteen of 29 for 147 yards. The Rams and Hill would win a third straight as he threw for 320 yards and three passing touchdowns and rushing for another to secure the Governor's Cup against Brown. After his four touchdown performance against Brown he was named the CAA Football Offensive Player of the Week and NEFWA Golden Helmet Award winner. The following game against Stony Brook he went 21 of 37 for a touchdown and he ran for 66 yards and another touchdown, both touchdowns coming in the fourth quarter. He would win back-to-back CAA Football Offensive Player of the Week honors after that performance. He would lead an upset win over No. 9 Delaware for the team's fifth straight win to start out 5–0. Hill would then struggle for the next two weeks as the team lost three in a row to Towson, Villanova, and Maine. He had a bounce-back game against Maine despite the loss as he threw for three touchdowns on eleven of twenty passing. The Rams and Hill would upset FBS opponent UMass in Warren McGuirk Alumni Stadium 35–22 as he threw for 169 yards on eleven of twenty passing alongside two touchdowns, he also tallied two more rushing touchdowns on the ground. The team would beat New Hampshire after a four touchdown day from Hill, before dropping the last game of the season to Elon, where he threw the ball 55 times, completing it 31 times, and going for 394 yards and three touchdowns. Despite his dominant performance the team would lose 28–43 to Davis Cheek and Elon to finish the year at 7–4.

In Hill's redshirt senior season, he was voted as team captain by teammates, and he was one of thirty players nationally to be named to the CFPA National Performer of the Year Midseason Watch List. He started all eleven games for the Rams and he helped lead them to the third-highest scoring offense in the CAA (30.6). Hill started off the year going 17 of 32 for 236 yards, two touchdowns, and no interceptions against Stony Brook. The next week he would go fourteen of twenty for 290 yards and two touchdowns against Bryant while surpassing 3,000 career passing yards at URI. The team lost back-to-back games against Delaware and FBS opponent Pittsburgh. Hill led the Rams past Brown to capture their fourth-straight Governor's Cup win. In that game he was responsible for 331 yards of total offense and two touchdowns. The next week the Rams beat Elon, and then in a game that went into seven overtimes Hill threw for 352 yards, three touchdowns, and a rushing touchdown against Monmouth. The team lost by one point to William & Mary while he once again threw for two touchdowns and rushed for another. Finishing out the year the team beat Maine, lost to New Hampshire, and on Hill's senior night they beat Albany 35–21. In the final game of his career he threw for 105 yards and two touchdowns to cap off the year in which he threw for 2,588 yards, nineteen touchdowns and seven interceptions for his best season statistically.

On February 3, 2023, Hill was granted his seventh year of eligibility.

Statistics

Personal life 
Hill is the son of Joe and Michele Hill. He has a younger sister, Kaylah, who has Down Syndrome. He is known to volunteer for feeding the homeless, mentoring for elementary students, and raising funds for the National Down Syndrome Society (NDSS).

References

External links 
Rhode Island Rams bio
Maryland Terrapins bio
Tennessee Volunteers bio

1997 births
Living people
Players of American football from Washington, D.C.
People from Washington, D.C.
American football quarterbacks
Rhode Island Rams football players
Maryland Terrapins football players
Tennessee Volunteers football players
Gilman School alumni